Hillsdale High School is a public co-educational high school in San Mateo, California, serving grades 9–12 as part of the San Mateo Union High School District. Hillsdale generally serves the residents of San Mateo and Foster City. The main feeder schools to Hillsdale are Abbott, Bayside, Borel, and Bowditch Middle Schools of the San Mateo-Foster City School District.

History
When it opened in 1955, Hillsdale High School was awarded the School Design Award from the American Institute of Architects. It served as the prototype for Bay Area high schools, with indoor/outdoor passages, landscaped courtyards, and skylights in classrooms. The design is credited to John Lyon Reid.

In the late 1980s and early 1990s, teachers Greg Jouriles and Sue Bedford developed and implemented an integrated humanities curriculum, scheduling social studies and English classes back-to-back. The extended periods were first rolled out to first-year honors students in 1989, followed by a parallel program implemented by Christine Del Gaudio and Marty Kongsle for the remaining first-year students in 1992. 1994 marked the start of the annual Battle at Dawn, a re-enactment of the Battle of Neuve Chapelle for first-year students at HHS as part of their studies about World War I.

In 1996, HHS proposed implementing a senior exhibition as a graduation requirement to pass fourth-year English classes. Students would have to defend a fifteen-page thesis before a three-member panel for their senior exhibition, which drew attention from parents concerned their children would not pass. The senior exhibition requirement was implemented in 1997, and the review of multiple drafts added a substantial load to teachers' grading burden, including one-on-one assistance and mentoring. As a result, a tutorial period was added to the teachers' schedules in 1999, and the English, social studies, and math teachers collaborated to create the Reflective, Eager, Aspiring, Learning Masters (REALM) program to help personalize instruction. Jeff Gilbert left HHS in 2001 to join the Stanford Teacher Education Program, introducing the two schools, and Stanford faculty entered into a Professional Development School relationship with HHS in the fall of 2001.

In the early 2000s, HHS won multiple grants to transform school culture into small learning communities (SLC), an approach championed by Linda Darling-Hammond, who had introduced HHS faculty to the concept during a professional development day in January 2002. The planning for SLCs at HHS was funded by a spring 2002 federal grant which culminated in Coyote Point Day, a two-day discussion and planning session held offsite at Coyote Point Park in November 2002.

Under the SLC model, incoming first-year students at HHS are divided into four houses (Florence, Kyoto, Oaxaca, and Marrakech), named for important medieval centers of learning; each house has approximately 100 students, who stay with a common set of teachers covering math, English, social science, and science for two years.

Campus
SMUHSD residents approved Measure D in 2000 and Measure M in 2006, which directly funded the repair and modernization of District schools, including Hillsdale.

Statistics

Demographics
2020-2021
1,689 students: 862 male (51%), 827 female (49%)

Athletics
Hillsdale participates in the Peninsula Athletic League (PAL) in the following sports:

Cross country
Football
Golf
Tennis
Volleyball
Water Polo
Basketball
Soccer
Wrestling
Badminton
Softball
Swimming
Track and Field
Baseball
Lacrosse

Awards
Hillsdale High School has received a number of awards and honors:
1955 American Institute of Architects School Design award for its Neo-Brutalist style
1990 "Best of San Mateo County" by the San Mateo County Times
1993 Named a United States Department of Education, National Blue Ribbon School
2001 Stanford Graduate School of Education's first Professional Development School
2007 Named a California Distinguished School
2009–2010  The Mock Trial team won first place in the California State Mock Trial Championship (and ultimately placed 19th at the national competition in Philadelphia, PA)
2011 Ranked no. 225 in the Newsweek Top 1,000 Public High Schools
2016 Received Gold Recognition from Schools of Opportunity

Notable alumni
Valerie Fleming, Olympic Silver Medalist and World Cup Champion bobsledder.
Billy Hardwick, Bowling Hall of Fame.
John Holdren, scientist, director of the White House Office of Science and Technology Policy, co-chair of the President's Council of Advisors on Science and Technology.
Karen Kraft, two-time Olympic Medalist in women's rowing.
Jay Mathews, author and education columnist with The Washington Post.
J. Michael McGinnis, physician and public health scholar.
Jed Rose, credited with co-inventing the nicotine patch.
Thomas Schumacher, theatrical producer.
Nick Vanos (d. 1987), former NBA player with the Phoenix Suns.
David Yarnold, former assistant managing editor of the San Jose Mercury News and president and CEO of the National Audubon Society.

See also

San Mateo County high schools

References

External links

San Mateo Union High School District official website
Great Schools profile
California Department of Education - DataQuest reports

Educational institutions established in 1955
High schools in San Mateo County, California
Public high schools in California
1955 establishments in California